Francisco José Rodrigues da Costa  (born 1 December 1974), known as Costinha, is a Portuguese former professional footballer who played as a defensive midfielder, currently a manager.

Best known for his tackling and positioning, as well as his athleticism, stamina and workrate, he played for clubs in Portugal, France, Russia, Spain and Italy. He won eight trophies with Porto, including the 2004 Champions League.

Costinha played more than 50 times with Portugal, appearing with the national team in one World Cup and two European Championships and being part of the squad that reached the final in Euro 2004. After retiring, he worked as a manager for Beira-Mar, Paços Ferreira, Académica and Nacional.

Club career
Costinha was born in Lisbon to an Angolan father, who had immigrated to the Portuguese capital in the 1960s. In the summer of 1997, after four years in the third division, he caught the interest of French club AS Monaco FC who signed him from C.D. Nacional. After a tentative first season he became an important first-team member, helping with 28 matches and one goal to the 1999–2000 conquest of the Ligue 1 championship; he was part of a talented side which ousted Manchester United from the UEFA Champions League in 1998, on the away goals rule.

Aged almost 27, Costinha made his Primeira Liga debut when he joined FC Porto in 2001, going on to be an instrumental midfield element in the northerners' two consecutive national championships. On 9 March 2004, he scored against and effectively knocked out Manchester United in the Champions League first knockout round; Porto went on to win the title, beating his former side Monaco 3–0 in the final.

Again a starter throughout most of the 2004–05 campaign, Costinha was sold to FC Dynamo Moscow in May 2005 for €4 million alongside teammates Maniche and Giourkas Seitaridis, following Derlei, who left in January. Unsettled, he moved to Atlético Madrid ahead of 2006–07.

Costinha was released by the Spaniards in August 2007, joining Serie A's Atalanta BC, where he appeared very rarely throughout his spell – only one match, in his first season – due to serious injuries and later because he was not considered fit to play competitively, despite him having the highest salary in the first team (€700,000 per year, in a contract due to expire in June 2010). The club tried to agree a mutual termination of the contract with him, and also attempted unsuccessfully to rescind it through the Italian Football League.

International career
Costinha made his debut for Portugal on 14 October 1998, in a 3–0 home win against Slovakia for the UEFA Euro 2000 qualifiers. He was selected for the final stages, where he scored an injury time header against Romania (same score).

He also played at Euro 2004 and the 2006 FIFA World Cup tournaments. During the latter, on 25 June, he took part in the Battle of Nuremberg, being one of four players sent off in the 1–0 round-of-16 victory over the Netherlands after two bookable offences, the second being a handball.

Costinha finished his international career with 53 caps and two goals, having been rarely called during the Euro 2008 qualifying stage.

Coaching career
On 23 February 2010, the 35-year-old Costinha left Atalanta by mutual consent. He immediately retired, being named shortly afterwards as Sporting CP's director of football, succeeding the sacked Ricardo Sá Pinto, his former international teammate. On 9 February 2011, the day after an interview to Sport TV in which he criticised the club's board of directors, he was dismissed.

In June 2011, in the same capacity, Costinha joined Servette FC, with the Swiss team being managed by countryman João Alves. It was reported that the pair did not see eye to eye on certain issues, and in November 2011, Alves was relieved of his duties and replaced by João Carlos Pereira. The team's results worsened under Peireira and in April 2012, both Pereira and Costinha were fired, with Alves being reinstated as manager; Costinha reportedly contested the terms of his removal, claiming that his contract extended until June 2013.

Costinha was hired as manager of S.C. Beira-Mar on 18 February 2013, replacing Ulisses Morais. He left the club on 22 May, after its top-flight relegation.

On 12 June 2013, Costinha was appointed at fellow league team F.C. Paços de Ferreira, who had made the qualifying rounds of the Champions League for the first time in its history; his midfield partner for Portugal and three clubs, Maniche, was hired as assistant. Costinha was sacked after only four months, however, due to poor results.

On 20 June 2016, Costinha took over at Académica de Coimbra, recently relegated from the top division. Maniche again assisted him, until leaving for personal reasons in October.

On 30 May 2017, Costinha was appointed as manager of C.D. Nacional. In his first year, they were promoted back to the top tier as champions.

Costinha left a year later by mutual consent, due to the Madeira team's relegation as second from the bottom. Negative highlights included a 10–0 loss against eventual champions S.L. Benfica, on 10 February 2019.

Costinha returned to Nacional – again relegated from the main division – on 28 June 2021, on a one-year deal. He left on 20 September, having achieved a win and a draw in five games.

Career statistics

Club
Sources:

International
Source:

|}

Managerial statistics

Honours

Player
Monaco
Ligue 1: 1999–2000
Trophée des Champions: 1997, 2000

Porto
Primeira Liga: 2002–03, 2003–04
Taça de Portugal: 2002–03
Supertaça Cândido de Oliveira: 2003, 2004
UEFA Champions League: 2003–04
UEFA Cup: 2002–03
Intercontinental Cup: 2004

Portugal
UEFA European Championship runner-up: 2004

Manager
Nacional
LigaPro: 2017–18

Orders
 Medal of Merit, Order of the Immaculate Conception of Vila Viçosa (House of Braganza)

References

External links

1974 births
Living people
Portuguese sportspeople of Angolan descent
Portuguese footballers
Footballers from Lisbon
Association football midfielders
Primeira Liga players
Segunda Divisão players
Clube Oriental de Lisboa players
C.D. Nacional players
FC Porto players
Ligue 1 players
AS Monaco FC players
Russian Premier League players
FC Dynamo Moscow players
La Liga players
Atlético Madrid footballers
Serie A players
Atalanta B.C. players
UEFA Champions League winning players
UEFA Cup winning players
Portugal international footballers
UEFA Euro 2000 players
UEFA Euro 2004 players
2006 FIFA World Cup players
Portuguese expatriate footballers
Expatriate footballers in Monaco
Expatriate footballers in Russia
Expatriate footballers in Spain
Expatriate footballers in Italy
Portuguese expatriate sportspeople in Monaco
Portuguese expatriate sportspeople in Russia
Portuguese expatriate sportspeople in Spain
Portuguese expatriate sportspeople in Italy
Portuguese football managers
Primeira Liga managers
Liga Portugal 2 managers
S.C. Beira-Mar managers
F.C. Paços de Ferreira managers
Associação Académica de Coimbra – O.A.F. managers
C.D. Nacional managers